Hugh Campbell (born 1941) is a former American football and Canadian football player, coach, and executive.

Hugh Campbell may also refer to:

Sir Hugh Campbell (1615–1686), Scottish baronet of Cessnock in Ayrshire
Sir Hugh Campbell of Calder (died 1716) Member of the Parliament of Scotland for Nairnshire
Hugh Campbell, 3rd Earl of Loudoun (1675–1731), Scottish landowner, peer, and statesman
Hugh Campbell (baseball) (1846–1881), Irish-American baseball player
Hugh Hume-Campbell, 3rd Earl of Marchmont (1708–1794), Scottish politician
Hugh Campbell (Australian politician) (c. 1854–1921), Australian politician
Hugh Campbell (New Zealand politician) (1875–1951), New Zealand politician
Hugh Lester Campbell (1908–1987), Canadian air marshal and politician
Hugh Campbell, 4th Earl Cawdor (1870–1914), Scottish nobleman
Hugh Campbell, 6th Earl Cawdor (1935–1993), Scottish nobleman 
Bonny Campbell (Hugh Campbell, 1898–1987), Australian footballer
Hugh Campbell (rugby union), Scottish rugby coach
Hugh M. Campbell (1914–2002), Australian philatelist
Hugh Campbell (footballer) (born 1911), Scottish footballer
Hugh Hamilton Campbell, architect in Warwick, Queensland, Australia